La Tropa F is a Tejano music group from San Antonio, Texas.  Originally named Los Hermanos Farias, the group changed its name to La Tropa F in the 1990s. In 1993, the group won the Tejano Music Award for Best Album of the Year with Right On Track.

Members
 Jesse Farias, Jr.:  lead vocals 
 Jaime Farias:  Keyboards, accordion 
 Joe Farias:  bajo sexto 
 Jesse Farias:  bass guitar  
 Anthony Farias:  percussion, keyboards
 Santos Aguilar:  Drums

References

External links

Musical groups from San Antonio
Tejano music groups